"Bottom of a Bottle" is the debut single from American rock band Smile Empty Soul's eponymous album.  The song was released in 2003 and ranked No. 7 on Alternative Songs.

Composition and lyrics 
Contrary to some of the lyrics, the song talks about influencing people to do whatever it is that keeps them going and makes them feel alive, indicating that the word "drug" is a metaphor for the same.

Featured on 
 Xtreme Sessionz, Vol. 1 (Lava Room)
 Nu Rock Traxx, Vol. 49 (Erg)
 Promo Only: Modern Rock Radio

Personnel 
 Sean Danielsen – vocals, guitar, writer
 Ryan Martin – bass, writer
 Derek Gledhill – drums, writer
 John Lewis Parker - producer
 David J. Holman - mixing

Chart performance

References 

2003 songs
2003 singles
Nu metal songs
Smile Empty Soul songs